Black River Township is one of ten townships in Butler County, Missouri, USA.  As of the 2010 census, its population was 1,665.

Geography
It contains eight cemeteries: Black River, Davidson, Harwell, Keele, Magill, Military Crossing, Nunley and Three Springs.

The streams of Aldridge Creek, Hartman Creek, Powers Creek, Swift Creek and Widow Creek run through this township.

References

External links
 US-Counties.com
 City-Data.com

Townships in Butler County, Missouri
Townships in Missouri